Lachnellula willkommii is a species of fungi belonging to the family Lachnaceae.

It is native to Eurasia and Northern America.

References

Helotiales